Christophe Bays (born March 28, 1991) is a Swiss professional ice hockey goaltender. He is currently playing with HC La Chaux-de-Fonds of the Swiss League (SL).

Bays made his National League A debut playing with Lausanne HC during the 2013–14 NLA season.

References

External links

1991 births
Living people
Genève-Servette HC players
Lausanne HC players
Swiss ice hockey goaltenders